Happy Together (pronounced as Happy to Get Her) is a Philippine television comedy series broadcast by GMA Network. Directed by Edgar Mortiz, it stars John Lloyd Cruz. It premiered on December 26, 2021 on the network's Sunday Grande sa Gabi line up replacing The Clash.

Cast and characters
Lead cast
 John Lloyd Cruz as Julian

Supporting cast
 Miles Ocampo as Elizabeth "Liz" Rodriguez (season 1-2)
 Jason Gainza as Mike Escaño
 Eric Nicolas as Anton (season 1-2)
 Carmi Martin as Crispina  "Pining" Y. Rodriguez (season 1-2)
 Janus del Prado as T.G.
 Ashley Rivera as Regina "Pam" Ferrer
 Kleggy Abaya as Kanor
 Vito Quizon as Joselito "Joey" Rodriguez
 Leo Bruno as Oscar "Oca" Escaño 
 Wally Waley as Andy
 Arra San Agustin as Shelly (season 3; recurring season 1-2)
 Ana Jalandoni as Eba (season 3; recurring season 1-2)
 Jenzel Angeles as Rocky (season 1-2)

Recurring cast
 Julie Anne San Jose as Anna Roberto
 Jobert Austria as Bart
 Empoy Marquez as Emmanuel "Emman" Arturo
 Liezel Lopez as MJ

Ratings
According to AGB Nielsen Philippines' Nationwide Urban Television Audience Measurement People in television homes, the pilot episode of Happy Together earned a 12% rating.

References

External links
 
 

2021 Philippine television series debuts
Filipino-language television shows
GMA Network original programming
Philippine comedy television series
Philippine television sitcoms
Television shows set in the Philippines